The 1900–01 Kansas Jayhawks men's basketball team represented the University of Kansas in its third season of collegiate basketball. The head coach was James Naismith, the inventor of the game, who served his 3rd year. The Jayhawks finished the season 4–8.

Roster
Clyde Allphin
Frederick Owens
Ernest Quigley
Chester Smith

Schedule

‡ – KU walked off the court and forfeited the game following a dispute over the rules.

References

Kansas Jayhawks men's basketball seasons
Kansas
Kansas
Kansas